La Pryor Independent School District is a public school district based in the community of La Pryor, Texas (USA).

In addition to La Pryor, the district also serves rural areas in northwestern Zavala County.

In 2018, the school district was rated "academically acceptable" by the Texas Education Agency.

Schools
La Pryor High (Grades 7-12)
La Pryor Elementary (Grades PK-6)

References

External links
 

School districts in Zavala County, Texas